John Jones may refer to:

Academics
John Collier Jones (1770–1838), academic administrator at the University of Oxford in England
John Winter Jones (1805–1881), English librarian
John Carleton Jones (1856–1930), American educator and tenth president of the University of Missouri
John Robert Jones (1911–1970), Welsh philosopher
John Jones (academic) (1924–2016), professor at Merton College, Oxford Professor of Poetry 1978–1983
John Finbarr Jones (1929–2013), Irish–born American academic

Arts and entertainment

Literature
John Jones (Jac Glan-y-gors) (1766–1821), Welsh language satirical poet and radical pamphleteer
John Jones (Talhaiarn) (1810–1869), Welsh poet
John Beauchamp Jones (1810–1866), American writer
John Jones (Myrddin Fardd) (1836–1921), Welsh writer
John Owen Jones (Ap Ffarmwr) (1861–1899), Welsh writer
John Gwilym Jones, Welsh dramatist, writer, academic and critic
John Tudor Jones, Welsh journalist, poet and translator
J'onn J'onzz, fictional Martian superhero of DC Comics, also known as the Martian Manhunter whose human guise is also known as "John Jones"
John Jones (character), fictional mission controller in the CHERUB book series

Performing arts
John Jones (organist) (1728–1796), organist at St Paul's Cathedral
John Joseph Jones (writer) (1930–2000), British and Australian poet, folk singer, musician, playwright, and theatre director
John Bush Jones (1940–2019), American author, theatre director, critic and educator
John Paul Jones (musician) (born 1946), English bassist for Led Zeppelin
John Pierce Jones (born 1946), Welsh actor
John Marshall Jones (born 1962), American actor and director
John "Jonesy" Jones, character in Fortnite Battle Royale

Visual arts
John Jones of Gellilyfdy (1578–1658), Welsh calligrapher, manuscript collector and antiquary
John Jones (engraver) (1755–1797), British engraver
John Jones (art collector) (c. 1798/99–1882), English art collector
John Edward Jones (sculptor) (1806–1862), Irish sculptor
John Llewellyn Jones (1866–1927), Australian artist and photographer
John Paul Jones (artist) (1924–1999), American painter and printmaker
John W. Jones (artist) (born c. 1950), American painter

Crime and notoriety
Shoni Sguborfawr (John Jones, 1811–1858), Welsh criminal known for role in Rebecca riots
John Jones (Coch Bach y Bala) (1854–1913), Welsh criminal
John Jones, alias used in the John Darwin disappearance case

Military

John Jones Maesygarnedd (c. 1597–1660), Welsh military leader, one of the regicides of King Charles I, member of Cromwell's Upper House
John Paul Jones (1747–1792), U.S. naval commander of the American Revolutionary War
Sir John Thomas Jones (1783–1843), British major-general in the Royal Engineers
John M. Jones (1820–1864), Confederate general in the American Civil War; wounded at Gettysburg
John R. Jones (1827–1901), Confederate general in the American Civil War at Antietam and Chancellorsville
John J. Jones (general) (1828–1868), Union officer in the American Civil War
John B. Jones (1834–1881), Confederate major in the American Civil War and Texas Ranger captain
John E. Jones (Medal of Honor) (1834–?), American Civil War recipient of the Medal of Honor
John Jones (Medal of Honor) (1841–1907), American Civil War recipient of the Medal of Honor
John Jones (RAF airman), World War I flying ace
John Cecil Jones (1915–1946), American military veteran who was tortured and lynched near Minden, Louisiana

Politics and law

Australia
John Gore Jones (1820–1868), member of the Queensland Legislative Assembly
John Jones (Queensland politician) (1872–1950), Australian politician
John Percy Jones (1872–1955), Australian politician
Jack Jones (Australian politician) (John Joseph Jones, 1907–1997), Australian politician

Canada
John Jones (died 1818) (c. 1752–1818), businessman and political figure in Lower Canada
John Jones (Bedford politician) (1761–1842), politician in Lower Canada
John Walter Jones (1878–1954), Canadian politician

United Kingdom
John Jones (MP for Gloucester) (died 1630), English politician
John Jones (Parliamentarian) (1610–1692), English Member of Parliament for the City of London, 1661–1679
John Gale Jones (1769–1838), English political radical
John Jones of Ystrad (1777–1842), MP for Carmarthen, 1821–1832
John Jones (Carmarthenshire MP) (1812–1886), British Member of Parliament for Carmarthenshire, 1868–1880
John Jones (Ivon) (1820-1898), Welsh radical and man of letters
John Jones (ironmaster) (1835–1897), English politician and mayor of Wolverhampton
John Share Jones (1873–1950), British veterinary surgeon and politician
Jack Jones (Silvertown MP) (John Joseph Jones, 1873–1941), British Labour MP for Silvertown
Jack Jones (Rotherham MP) (John Henry Jones, 1894–1962), British Labour MP for Bolton, later MP for Rotherham
John Edward Jones (Welsh politician) (1905–1970), Welsh political organiser
Sir John Jones (MI5 officer) (1923–1998), Director General of MI5, the United Kingdom's internal security service
John Walter Jones (Wales) (1946-2020), civil servant and the first Chief Executive of the Welsh Language Board

United States
John Coffin Jones Sr. (1750–1829), politician in the Massachusetts House of Representatives
John Gabriel Jones (1752–1776), colonial American pioneer and politician
John Rice Jones (1759–1824), American politician, jurist, and pioneer
John Patterson Jones (1779–1858), New York politician
John Winston Jones (1791–1848), U.S. congressman from Virginia
John Coffin Jones Jr. (1796–1861), United States consular agent to the Kingdom of Hawaii
John William Jones (1806–1871), U.S. congressman from Georgia
John Jones (abolitionist) (1816 - 1879)
John Wallace Jones (1822–1895), American judge
John James Jones (1824–1898), U.S. representative from Georgia
John P. Jones (1829–1912), Republican senator from Nevada and founder of Santa Monica, California
John Paul Jones (Louisiana politician), state senator in Louisiana
John H. Jones (American politician) (1836–1875), member of the Wisconsin State Senate
John S. Jones (1836–1903), Union brevet brigadier general and later U.S. congressman from Ohio
John Edward Jones (governor) (1840–1896), Welsh-born governor of Nevada
John D. Jones (Minnesota politician) (1849–1914), speaker of the Minnesota House of Representatives
John Jones (county commissioner) (1816–1878), member of the Cook County Board of Commissioners in Illinois
John Jones (Los Angeles politician), president of the Los Angeles, California, Common Council 1870–1871
John R. Jones (Wisconsin politician) (1850–?), member of the Wisconsin State Assembly
John George Jones (1854–?), American lawyer
Evan John Jones (politician) (1872–1952), U.S. representative from Pennsylvania
John R. Jones (Washington politician) (1877–1972), member of the Washington House of Representatives
John Marvin Jones (1882–1976), U.S. Representative from Texas
John D. Jones (Washington politician) (1923-2014), Welsh-American politician in the state of Washington
John Bailey Jones (1927-2023), South Dakota state representative 1957–1960 and U.S. federal judge
John O. Jones (born 1940), Illinois state senator
John E. Jones III (born 1955), U.S. federal judge for the Middle District of Pennsylvania
John Jones (abolitionist) (1817–1879), American abolitionist, civil rights leader, philanthropist, and businessman
John W. Jones (Alabama politician), state legislator in Alabama

Elsewhere
John Jones (Ojibwa chief) (1798–1847), Chief of the Credit Mission Ojibwa, 1840–1847
John Richard Jones (died 1911), 19th century New Zealand politician

Religion

John Jones (martyr) (died 1598), Welsh saint
John Jones (physician) (1644/5–1709), Welsh cleric, inventor and physician
John Jones (dean of Bangor) (1650–1727), Dean of Bangor Cathedral
John Jones (controversialist) (1700–1770), Welsh clergyman
John Jones (Unitarian) (1766–1827), Welsh minister, critic, tutor and lexicographer
John Jones (literary patron) (1773–1853), Welsh priest, scholar and literary patron
John Elias (born John Jones, 1774–1841), Welsh preacher
John Jones (archdeacon of Merioneth) (1775–1834), Welsh priest and writer
Llef o'r Nant (pseudonym of John Jones, 1782/87–1863), Welsh priest and antiquarian
John Jones (archdeacon of Liverpool) (1791–1889)
John Jones (Tegid) (1792–1852), Welsh clergyman and writer
John Jones, Talysarn (1796–1857), Welsh preacher
John Jones (archdeacon of Bangor) (1798–1863), Welsh Anglican priest
John Taylor Jones (1802–1851), Protestant missionary to Siam, now Thailand
John Wynne Jones (1803–1888), Welsh Anglican priest
John Harris Jones (1827–1885), Calvinistic Methodist minister and classical tutor
John Hugh Jones (1843–1910), Welsh Roman Catholic priest
John Daniel Jones (1865–1942), Welsh Congregational minister
John Islan Jones (1874–1968), Welsh Unitarian minister and writer
John Jones (bishop) (1904–1956), Welsh Anglican missionary and Bishop of Bangor
John Jones (archdeacon of St Asaph) (1905–1996), Welsh Anglican archdeacon

Science and medicine
John Jones (doctor) (1729–1791), American surgeon
John Jones (astronomer) (1818–1898), Welsh amateur astronomer
John Welch Jones (1826–1916), American medical doctor and Civil War cavalry officer
John Jones (geologist) (1835–1877), English geologist
John Viriamu Jones (1856–1901), British scientist and educationalist
John Chris Jones (born 1927), Welsh engineer
John Spencer Jones (1924–2007), British chest physician

Sports

American football
John Jones (American football executive) (born 1952), American football executive
John Jones (tight end) (born 1975), American football tight end
John "J. J." Jones (1952–2009), American football quarterback
John "Lam" Jones (1958–2019), American sprinter and professional football wide receiver

Association football (soccer)
John Jones (footballer, born 1856) (1856–1889), Druids F.C. and Wales international footballer
John Jones (footballer, born 1860) (1860–1902), Berwyn Rangers F.C. and Wales international footballer
John Owen Jones (footballer) (1871–1955), Bangor F.C., Newton Heath F.C. and Wales international footballer
John H. Jones (footballer) (1873–1955), British footballer in the 1900 Olympics
John Love Jones (1885–1913), Stoke F.C., Middlesbrough F.C. and Wales international footballer
John Jones (footballer, born 1895) (1895–1962), Welsh footballer
John Jones (footballer, born 1916) (1916–1978), Welsh footballer
John Jones (soccer) (born 1973), retired American soccer midfielder

Cricket
John Thomas Jones (1783–1843), English cricketer
John Jones (English cricketer) (1858–1937), English cricketer
John Jones (cricketer) (1899–1991), Australian cricketer

Rugby
Arthur Jones (rugby union) (John Arthur Jones, 1857–1919), Welsh international rugby union forward
John Jones known as Bala Jones, Wales international rugby player
Jack Jones (rugby, born 1890) (John Jones, 1890–?), rugby union and rugby league footballer of the 1910s for Wales (RU), Abertillery, and Oldham (RL)
John Jones (rugby league) (born 1966), Australian rugby league player for the Manly Sea Eagles and South Queensland Crushers
Johnny Jones (rugby league) (born 1919), English rugby league footballer of the 1940s for Leeds, and Wakefield Trinity

Other sports
John Paul Jones (athlete) (1890–1970), American track athlete
John Jones (baseball) (1901–1956), American baseball player
John Jones (rower) (1930-2011), British rower
John Jones (racing driver) (born 1965), Canadian racecar driver
John Jones (golfer) (1863–1921), English professional golfer
John Jones (water polo) (1925–2016), British Olympic water polo player
John Edward Jones (1983-2009), caver who died in the Nutty Putty Cave

Others

Johnny Jones (pioneer) (1809–1869), New Zealand settler and pioneer
John W. Jones (ex-slave) (1817–1900), American ex-slave
Casey Jones (1864–1900), American folk hero
John H. Jones and Carrie Otis Jones (c. 1834–1902), American property developers
John Treasure Jones (1905–1993), British sea officer
John F. Jones Jr., chief information officer of the National Institutes of Health 
John D. Jones (pilot boat), a 19th-century Sandy Hook pilot boat
John Elfed Jones, Welsh businessman and language activist
John Tecumseh Jones, Chippewa leader and businessman

See also
Jon Jones (disambiguation)
Johnny Jones (disambiguation)
Jonathan Jones (disambiguation)
Jack Jones (disambiguation)
John Paul Jones (disambiguation)
John P. Jones (disambiguation)
John Whitworth-Jones (1896–1981), Royal Air Force air marshal

John (disambiguation)
Jones (disambiguation)